Pulsatilla koreana, the Korean pasque flower (Korean Hal-mi-kkot, 할미꽃), is one species of the genus Pulsatilla. P. koreana is a hairy, tufted, perennial herb. It is a native perennial plant growing in Korea and used as a traditional Korean herbal medicine.

Description

Pulsatilla koreana has six petal-like segments that have a silky exterior; stamens in a central boss are surrounded by a ring of staminoids. The leaves are pinnate in a basal rosette and there are five leaflets which are white-woolly pubescent (covered with erect hairs) beneath. The plant has bell-shaped flowers with scapose and pendent, blooming in spring. The flowers are hermaphrodite (have both male and female organs) and are pollinated by insects. They are solitary terminal on a peduncle of  length. Fruit is borne in heads with long feather styles.

Distribution and cultivation

Pulsatilla koreana is a native perennial plant growing in Korea. According to its native range, it is likely to succeed outdoors in most areas of the country. The following notes are based on the general needs of the genus Pulsatilla. The plant requires a well-drained, humus-rich, gritty soil and a sunny position. It also tolerates acid, neutral and basic (alkaline) soils and can grow in very alkaline soil. The plant prefers light (sandy) and medium (loamy) soils. It cannot grow in the shade and requires moist soil.

Traditional medicine
Pulsatilla koreana is a traditional Korean herbal medicine.

Folk tale
Pulsatilla koreana is called the "grandmother flower" in Korea. According to an old legend, there was a widow who had two daughters. The older daughter married a rich man but the younger daughter married into a family not so prosperous. When the widow became an old lady, she made plans to visit her daughters to see how they were doing. When she met the older daughter, however, she was denied entry and kicked out of the house. So the widow turned to her younger daughter. But she lived very far away over many mountains. The old widow still trudged on, but she eventually collapsed from exhaustion. Many hours later, the younger daughter found her mother not too far from her home, dead from fatigue. The grief-stricken daughter buried her mother's body near the house. When spring came next year, a strange flower bloomed on her grave. It had white tufts of hair and a hunched back, much like her old mother. Since then, people began to believe that the flower was a reincarnation of the dead widow, giving it the nickname "granny flower".

References

Bird. R. (Editor) Focus on Plants. Volume 5. (formerly 'Growing from seed') Thompson and Morgan. 1991
Hatfield. A. W. How to Enjoy your Weeds. Frederick Muller Ltd 1977 
Huxley. A. The New RHS Dictionary of Gardening. 1992. MacMillan Press 1992
http://www.asianinfo.org/asianinfo/north%20korea/pro-wildlife.htm

koreana